Wynfred Emory Allen (June 6, 1873 – September 20, 1947) was an American football and basketball coach and biologist. He served as the head football coach at Lawrence University in Appleton, Wisconsin in 1903 and at Kearney State Normal School—now known as the University of Nebraska–Kearney–from 1905 to 1906, compiling a career college football coaching record of 9–12–3. Allen was also the head basketball coach at Kearney State in 1906–07.

In 1910, Allen served as an assistant zoology professor at the University of Illinois at Urbana–Champaign, and from 1919 to 1943, he worked as a biologist at the Scripps Institution for Biological Research.

Head coaching record

Football

References

1873 births
1947 deaths
American biologists
Earlham College alumni
Lawrence Vikings football coaches
Nebraska–Kearney Lopers football coaches
Nebraska–Kearney Lopers men's basketball coaches
People from Marion County, Indiana
Basketball coaches from Indiana